Botwnnog is a village and community in Gwynedd in Wales, located on the Llŷn Peninsula  west-north-west of Abersoch. It is in the historic county of Caernarfonshire. It had a population of 955 in 2001, increasing to 996 at the 2011 Census.

It lies between Mynytho and Sarn Meyllteyrn (which is in the community), has two schools, Pont y Gof Primary School and Ysgol Botwnnog (secondary), and a doctors' surgery, Meddygfa Rhydbach.

The artist Moses Griffith (1749–1819) was born in Botwnnog and attended Ysgol Botwnnog. His watercolour Bottwnog church & free school is in the collection of the National Library of Wales. Welsh band Cowbois Rhos Botwnnog come from the small settlement of Rhos Botwnnog.

The community also includes the hamlets of Bryncroes and Llandegwning.

Ysgol Botwnnog
Ysgol Botwnnog, a bilingual comprehensive school with about 400 pupils aged 11 to 16, was originally a grammar school founded in 1616 by Henry Rowlands, Bishop of Bangor.

References

External links 

www.geograph.co.uk : photo of Botwnnog and surrounding area
Ysgol Botwnnog website
Photograph of pupils at Ysgol Botwnnog in 1913